{{Infobox person
|name        = Vipul D. Shah
|image       = Vipul Shah at office.jpg
|alt         =
|caption     = 
|birth_date = 
|birth_place =
|death_date  = 
|death_place =
|nationality = Indian
|other_names =
|known_for   = Baal veer,Comedy Nights Bachao, Kya Haal, Mr. Paanchal?, Crime Patrol, Ladies Special, Rising Star
|years_active  = 2001–present
|occupation  = Television producer
}}

Vipul D. Shah is an Indian television producer and writer known for fictional shows like Ladies Special and Kya Haal, Mr. Paanchal? and reality TV shows like Comedy Circus, Comedy Nights Bachao and Rising Star. He is also the founding chairman and managing director at Optimystix Entertainment.

Shah has received several recognitions for his work, like the Indian Television Academy Awards (ITA) under the best director category in 2009.

Early life
Shah comes from a Gujarati Jain family in a small town in Gujarat called Parnala.

Career
Shah started his career by writing and directing Gujarati serials. He made his debut as a writer with the Anand Mahendroo directed Dekh Bhai Dekh, for which he won the TV and Video World best writer award. He also worked on numerous comedy shows such as Philips Top 10, Battle of Bollywood, Asha Parekh's Daal Mein Kala, I Love You and the newly announced soap Lekin on SABe TV. Shah was the writer of the Bollywood film Rehna Hai Tere Dil Mein, produced by Vashu Bhagnani, which is the remake of a Tamil film Minnale'', which was also written by him.

Television
The following is the list of television shows written and produced by  Vipul D. Shah

Filmography

Films

Awards and recognition
 2009: Indian Television Academy Awards (ITA) under the best director category.

See also
 Suhaib Ilyasi
 Indian Film and TV Producers Council
 Ekta Kapoor

References

External links
 
 Optimystix Entertainment

Living people
People from Mumbai
Indian television producers
Indian television directors
Year of birth missing (living people)